SBSA may refer to:

 Server Base System Architecture, standardized server platform for ARM processors
 Spanish Broadcasting System, radio station operator in the U.S. (NASDAQ: SBSA)
 State Bank of South Australia